Lunca Mureșului is a commune located in the north-east of the Alba County, Transylvania, Romania. It is composed of two villages, Gura Arieșului (Vajdaszeg; Walddorf) and Lunca Mureșului.

Geography

Lunca Mureșului has an area of 31.35 km² and is located on the Mureș River, in the north-east corner of Alba County, approximately 10 km from the town of Ocna Mureș on the Romanian County Road 107F,  from the towns of Câmpia Turzii and Luduș, and 60 km from the county capital, Alba Iulia.

The commune is bordered by Cluj County in the north, Mureș County in the north-west, the town of Ocna Mureș in the west, and the commune of Noșlac in the south.

The commune is important from a geographical point of view because on its territory (in the village of Gura Arieșului) the river Arieș flows into the Mureș.

Demographics
The 2002 Romanian census recorded 2,669 people living in the commune, of which 1719 Romanians, 755 Hungarians (most of them in the village of Lunca Mureșului) and 195 Roma.

Natives
Sándor Kónya-Hamar

References

Communes in Alba County
Localities in Transylvania